In this year, Spartak Moscow won their fourth consecutive Russian title, and seventh overall.

Overview

Standings

Results

Top goalscorers

Awards 
On December 2 Russian Football Union named its list of 33 top players:

Goalkeepers
  Aleksandr Filimonov (Spartak Moscow)
  Ruslan Nigmatullin (Lokomotiv Moscow)
  Roman Berezovsky (Zenit)

Right backs
  Dmytro Parfenov (Spartak Moscow)
  Valeri Minko (CSKA Moscow)
  Aleksei Arifullin (Lokomotiv Moscow)

Right-centre backs
  Dmitri Khlestov (Spartak Moscow)
  Igor Cherevchenko (Lokomotiv Moscow)
  Vyacheslav Dayev (Torpedo Moscow)

Left-centre backs
  Igor Chugainov (Lokomotiv Moscow)
  Viktor Bulatov (Spartak Moscow)
  Yevgeni Varlamov (CSKA Moscow)

Left backs
  Sergei Gurenko (Lokomotiv Moscow)
  Yuri Kovtun (Spartak Moscow)
  Oleg Kornaukhov (CSKA Moscow)

Right wingers
  Sergei Semak (CSKA Moscow)
  Albert Sarkisyan (Lokomotiv Moscow)
  Olexandr Gorshkov (Zenit)

Right-center midfielders
  Alexey Smertin (Lokomotiv Moscow)
  Yuri Drozdov (Lokomotiv Moscow)
  Dmitri Khomukha (CSKA Moscow)

Left-center midfielders
  Yegor Titov (Spartak Moscow)
  Dmitri Loskov (Lokomotiv Moscow)
  Artyom Bezrodny (Spartak Moscow)

Left wingers
  Andrey Tikhonov (Spartak Moscow)
  Rolan Gusev (Dynamo Moscow)
  Yevgeni Kharlachyov (Lokomotiv Moscow)

Right forwards
  Aleksandr Panov (Zenit)
  Zaza Janashia (Lokomotiv Moscow)
  Aleksandr Shirko (Spartak Moscow)

Left forwards
  Giorgi Demetradze (Alania)
  Vladimir Kulik (CSKA Moscow)
  Oleg Teryokhin (Dynamo Moscow)

Medal squads

See also 
 1999 in Russian football

References

External links 
 RSSSF

1999
1
Russia
Russia